Nada Matić (born in Shkodër in 1984) is a disabled Serbian table tennis player.
In the 2016 Summer Paralympics she won bronze medal in the individual class 4 competition and with Borislava Perić she won silver medal in the Women's team – Class 4–5. She competed at the 2020 Summer Paralympics, in Team C4-5, winning a bronze medal.

Notes

1984 births
Serbian female table tennis players
Table tennis players at the 2016 Summer Paralympics
Paralympic table tennis players of Serbia
Medalists at the 2016 Summer Paralympics
Paralympic medalists in table tennis
Paralympic silver medalists for Serbia
Paralympic bronze medalists for Serbia
Living people
Sportspeople from Shkodër
Serbs in Albania
Table tennis players at the 2020 Summer Paralympics